Pattipulam is a village located in Tirupporur in Chengalpattu district of Tamil Nadu, India. This Gram panchayat belongs to both Tirupporur and Kancheepuram constituencies.

References 

Villages in Chengalpattu district